Elmwood Place is a historic farmstead in the southwestern corner of Union County, Ohio, United States.

In 1866, the property where Elmwood Place sits — then open fields — was purchased by James Fullington.  One of Union County's most prominent landholders, Fullington soon began construction of the present farm buildings.  First to be completed was the farmhouse, finished in 1868; a carriage house and a large barn were completed in 1870, and the remaining buildings — two small frame sheds and a cottage for tenants, which was moved from its original location — were all erected by 1877.

The farmhouse at Elmwood Place is a large brick building with a porch. It was constructed with many Italianate details, such as the cornices, the arched windows and doors, and many interior elements.  Because both the house and the other buildings remain in a fine state of preservation, Elmwood Place has been named one of Union County's best examples of 19th-century rural architecture.  In recognition of its status, the farm was added to the National Register of Historic Places in late 1979; it is one of seven places in the county to have been recognized.

References

Houses completed in 1868
Houses on the National Register of Historic Places in Ohio
Italianate architecture in Ohio
Houses in Union County, Ohio
National Register of Historic Places in Union County, Ohio
1868 establishments in Ohio